Robert Médus, (Carcassonne, 12 April 1929 - Peyrestortes, 16 July 1994) was a French former rugby union and rugby league footballer.

He played his first part of career in rugby union for Mazamet alongside Lucien Mias. In 1955, he switched  codes and opted for rugby league successfully. He played for XIII Catalan and won the French Championship in 1957. He later signed for Carcassonne and won a Lord Derby Cup in 1961. For his club performances, he is called up five times for the France national team between 1956 and 1957, taking part at the 1957 Rugby League World Cup.

Biography 
He represented France in the 1957 Rugby League World Cup with his teammates Henri Delhoste and Francis Lévy.

Honours

Rugby league 
 Team :
 Winner of the French Championship : 1957 (XIII Catalan).
 Runner-up at the Lord Derby Cup : 1957 (XIII Catalan) and 1961 (Carcassonne).

References

External links 
 Robert Médus profile at rugbyleagueproject.com

French rugby league players
XIII Catalan players
1929 births
1994 deaths
French rugby union players
AS Carcassonne players
Rugby league props
Rugby league second-rows
People from Carcassonne
Sportspeople from Aude